South Delhi Public School  is a senior secondary school affiliated to Central Board of Secondary Education (CBSE), New Delhi. It is a co-educational day and boarding school.

History
The School was founded in 1966 as a primary school (initially named Sharda Public School) in A-Block, Defence Colony, New Delhi by the South Delhi Education Society (Regd.). Encouraged with the performance of the School, in 1968 the School management succeeded in getting 1.378 acre land allotted at the present site. Upgraded as a Middle School (15 July 1972) with recognition from Directorate of Education, Delhi, the Institute shifted to its new semi-constructed premises. The school was upgraded to the Secondary stage in 1982, and then to Senior Secondary stage in 1983.

Noted alumni
Rahul Verma, social worker and activist; founded the Uday Foundation

See also
Education in India
Education in Delhi
List of schools in Delhi
CBSE

References

External links

Educational institutions established in 1966
Private schools in Delhi
CBSE Delhi